Narwara Beerwah is a village in tehsil Beerwah of district Budgam of the Jammu and Kashmir.

References

Educational institutions 
Govt۔middle school narwara

Govt primary school narwara

Darul۔uloom Simnaniya ۔۔۔

Institutions ibn ussymein narwara

Villages in Budgam district